Yong He may refer to:

Yonghe (disambiguation)
He Yong (disambiguation) — a list of Chinese people with the surname of "He"